Hendrik Temminck, sometimes also Temming ( 1680 – 17 September 1727) was from 1 March 1722 to 17 September 1727, governor of the Dutch plantation colony of Surinam. 

Temminck was born in Arnhem around 1680. He studied law. After his promotion, he went to Suriname. In 1716, he was appointed sergeant major of an infantry division. On 1 March 1722, Temminck was appointed Governor of Suriname. The same year, he established a sugar plantation at Berg en Dal. He died on 17 September 1727 in Paramaribo. 

Temminck married twice; first with Machteld van Wouw, and in 1725 with Charlotta Elisabeth van der Lith. He became Swedish artist Fredrika Eleonora von Düben's maternal grandfather through his and van Wouw's daughter Catharina Eleonora Temminck.

References 

1680s births
Governors of Suriname
People from Arnhem
1727 deaths
Dutch planters
Dutch slave owners
18th-century Dutch military personnel

Dutch emigrants to Suriname